The HRH Princess Chulabhorn College of Medical Science is a higher educational institute located in Bangkok, Thailand focusing on health science and public health. It is a part of the Chulabhorn Royal Academy (CRA), named after Princess Chulabhorn Walailak.

History 
On 19 January 2016, a royal decree established the CRA as an advanced research and higher educational institute, and the HRH Princess Chulabhorn College of Medical Science to be a college within the academy specialising in medicine, nursing, and health sciences. PCCMS admits about 30 students per year in a 6-year Doctor of Medicine course affiliated with Mahidol University, and runs in conjunction with the Faculty of Medicine Ramathibodi Hospital, Mahidol University. CRA has also entered into an academic collaboration with UCL to access expertise to support the development and delivery of a high quality, contemporary undergraduate medicine programme.

Starting from academic year 2020, PCCMS expands the coverage to Veterinary Medicine offering Doctor of Veterinary Medicine which is the joint program with Mahidol University.

Organization 
The college consists of faculties as follow:

 Faculty of Medicine and Public Health
 Faculty of Nursing
 Faculty of Health Science Technology
 Faculty of Veterinary Medicine and Applied Zoology
 Academic Center for Advanced Clinical Education (ACE)

Teaching hospitals 
 Chulabhorn Hospital
 Police General Hospital (PCCMS-UCL Joint Program, Medicine Clinical Years 5-7)
Ramathibodi Hospital (PCCMS-Ramathibodi Program)
 Maharat Nakhon Ratchasima Hospital (PCCMS-Ramathibodi Program)
 Buriram Hospital (PCCMS-Ramathibodi Program)
 Phra Nakhon Si Ayutthaya Hospital (PCCMS-Ramathibodi Program)
 Chao Phraya Yommarat Hospital (PCCMS-Ramathibodi Program)

See also 
 List of medical schools in Thailand

References 

 Article incorporates material from the corresponding article in the Thai Wikipedia.

Medical schools in Thailand
Colleges in Thailand
Chulabhorn Royal Academy
Educational institutions established in 2016
2016 establishments in Thailand